Phillip Christopher Jupitus (né Swan; born 25 June 1962) is an English stand-up and improv comedian, actor, performance poet, cartoonist and podcaster. Jupitus was a team captain on all but one BBC Two-broadcast episode of music quiz Never Mind the Buzzcocks from its inception in 1996 until 2015, and also appears regularly as a guest on several other panel shows, including QI and BBC Radio 4's I'm Sorry I Haven't a Clue.

Early life

Born Phillip Swan in Newport on the Isle of Wight, he took his stepfather Alexander's surname Jupitus (a corruption of the Lithuanian name Šeputis) when he was 16. Jupitus attended a comprehensive school before winning a place at the boys' grammar school Woolverstone Hall School near Ipswich.

Career

Jupitus worked in Essex at the Manpower Services Commission, part of the Department of Employment, for five years, while he also wrote political poetry and drew cartoons. He resigned from the department in 1984, hoping for a career in the music industry.

Using the moniker Porky the Poet, Jupitus became associated with Anti-Fascist Action and the ranting poetry scene, alongside Kool Knotes, Seething Wells, Swift Nick and Attila the Stockbroker. Jupitus approached local bands to offer himself as a support act for their tours: "I thought it looked easy, I was very cheap. If you got another band to support you, there are probably four of them and roadies and managers. But me—I just turned up and read poems." His first vinyl recordings were part of the live Newtown Neurotics album Kickstarting a Backfiring Nation as Porky the Poet in 1987.

Jupitus toured colleges, universities and student unions, supporting bands such as Billy Bragg, the Style Council and The Housemartins. He supported Billy Bragg once more on the Labour Party-sponsored Red Wedge tour in 1985: "In the early '80s, I got involved with Red Wedge, in which Neil Kinnock got various bands to stage concerts for Labour. The reason I got involved was 20% because I believed in the cause, 30% because I loved Billy Bragg, and 50% because I wanted to meet Paul Weller".

After Red Wedge, he found it difficult to get other bookings, due to the decline of political poetry as a mainstream art. He got a job as a runner for the independent record label Go! Discs, which had signed Billy Bragg and other bands, such as the Housemartins. Bragg said: "We ended up managing to get him a job at Go! Discs, which was brilliant. I was concerned that the cut-throat nature of the record business would make him jaded—underneath that rhino exterior there is quite a sensitive person—but that was before I realised that he was going to come back and do gigs again. Working at Go! Discs got his confidence up."

His performances of two of his poems, "Beano" and "Nobby", were included in the 1986 album Not Just Mandela, alongside tracks by Bragg and Attila the Stockbroker, amongst others. Released on Davy Lamp Records, all proceeds of the record were going to the Anti-Apartheid Movement.

Jupitus became press officer and compère for The Housemartins (appearing in the 1986 music video for "Happy Hour"), using the role to continue being in front of an audience, while also filling support slots for other artists. During this time, he worked as a warm-up act on the Channel 4 TV show The Show. He quit working for Go! Discs in 1989 and fell back on his poetry and competing to try to gain a foothold on the London comedy circuit.

He conceived and directed the Brit Awards-nominated music video for Bragg's "Sexuality" in 1991 and wrote a parody version of that song about bestiality. He also appeared alongside R.E.M. in the music video for Bragg's "You Woke Up My Neighbourhood" and performed in Searchlight magazine's 2006 "Hope Not Hate" campaign tour with Bragg. He has also appeared numerous times at the Glastonbury Festival as a DJ and a compere in The Left Field tent. Jupitus produced the music video for Kirsty MacColl's 1991 single "All I Ever Wanted" from the album Electric Landlady. He appeared at her tribute concert in 2002 as compere, and also sang one of her songs, "Fifteen Minutes".

In 2000, he released the stand-up comedy DVD Phill Jupitus Live: Quadrophobia. In 2001, he appeared as a sports journalist in the film Mike Bassett: England Manager.

Jupitus made a guest appearance on the Bonzo Dog Doo-Dah Band 40th anniversary DVD performing with the band on the tracks "Mr. Apollo" and "Canyons of Your Mind", and has toured with them around the UK.  He appears on the Bonzos' 2007 album, Pour l'Amour des Chiens. Also in 2007, he performed with The Blockheads on their 30th anniversary tour. He continued to perform with them sporadically since Ian Dury's death, also appearing in Dury's place for "Drip Fed Fred" during the Madness concert at Wembley Arena shortly before Dury's death. Jupitus performed at the Reading and Leeds Festivals in 2008.

On 13–14 February 2009, Jupitus co-hosted the first BadMovieClub on Twitter. At midnight, over 2,000 Twitter users simultaneously pressed 'Play' on the film The Happening and continued to tweet whilst watching, creating a collective viewing experience that generated 40,000 tweets in under two hours. The first showing took place at 9:00pm, hosted by Graham Linehan.
Jupitus was awarded an honorary doctorate by the University of Essex in South Essex College's congregation ceremony in Southend on 30 September 2010. Jupitus was also awarded an honorary doctorate from the University of Kent, Canterbury in 2017, where his daughters had previously attended.

On 6 October 2010, Jupitus, along with Emma Kennedy, hosted a special comedy evening at the Canterbury Animation Festival 'Anifest'.

Jupitus attended the "I Do To Equal Marriage" event which celebrated the introduction of same-sex marriage in England and Wales in March 2014.

Radio
Jupitus began hosting his own radio show on BBC GLR in 1995, a regular job that would last until 2000.
After that, he embarked on his first stand-up comedy tour of the UK, Jedi, Steady, Go, performing the Star Wars story in a comedic fashion.

In 2002, Phill Jupitus was a stand-in presenter on BBC Radio 2 for Steve Wright while he was away on holiday.

Jupitus was the breakfast DJ on BBC Radio 6 Music from 2002 until 30 March 2007 (the last song played, by listener request, was "Broadway" by The Clash), and made brief returns to the station during the summer of 2007, sitting in for Stephen Merchant on Sunday afternoon and Liz Kershaw on Saturday mornings. In 2010, he publicly criticised the BBC's announcement that it was to discontinue the station, describing the decision as "not only an act of cultural vandalism, it's also an affront to the memory of John Peel and a slap in the face to thousands of licence-payers." Jupitus has since written a book about his time on 6 Music, entitled Good Morning Nantwich: Adventures in Breakfast Radio. In February 2010, as part of his research for the book, Jupitus presented the breakfast show for one week on Bournemouth University student radio station, Nerve Radio, produced by Mog McIntyre and co-presented by regular student presenters Guy Larsen and Jess Bracey.

On 9 September 2009, Jupitus narrated a half-hour documentary on BBC Radio 4 about the comic strip Calvin and Hobbes created by Bill Watterson.

Jupitus has worked on Radio 4 as a regular contributor to Loose Ends, The News Quiz (where his performances are notable for a range of parody voices), I'm Sorry I Haven't a Clue and Just a Minute. He also presented Best Sellers—a series on the life and work of Peter Sellers—and wrote and presented Disneyfied, a documentary on the work of Walt Disney. On 7 June 2020 he presented Pick of the Week.

Jupitus has also appeared in several episodes of the Radio 4 show The Unbelievable Truth and is a regular guest with the Comedy Store Players.

Television
Jupitus was one of the panellists on the first TV episode of the show Loose Talk, which made a brief transition from radio to television in 1994. In 1996, he joined BBC Two's pop quiz show Never Mind the Buzzcocks as a regular team captain – having appeared in every single episode of the original run, except for series 25, episode 6. He is the guest panellist who has made the joint largest number of appearances on QI, while his daughter, Emily Jupitus, currently works on the show as a researcher (or 'QI Elf'). He had a history of mimicking the QI host, Stephen Fry, while on the show. In December 1999, he had the lead role in Dark Ages, an ITV sitcom parodying preparations (and fears) for the year 2000, set in Essex in the year 999. Jupitus has played Councillor Cowdrey in CITV children's series Bottom Knocker Street since its first series in summer 2013.

Jupitus has presented several editions of the popular Top Ten series for Channel 4, while also joining another comedy panel game—It's Only TV...but I Like It—as a team captain, alongside Jonathan Ross and Julian Clary.

He has made one appearance in an episode of Holby City as a patient (in "Men are from Mars"). As a voice actor he has provided the voices for Dandelion in an ITV adaptation of Watership Down and also performing a selection of voices for Rex the Runt by Aardman Animations.

Jupitus is a continuity announcer for the UKTV channel Dave during the channel's evening schedule. During 2008, he did the voice over work for the Dave show Batteries Not Included. He also took part in the Dave show Comedy Exchange, where he went to America, while Eugene Mirman came to Britain. Here they each performed different routines in various events. He has appeared in Argumental for the same channel, where team captain Marcus Brigstocke made him laugh so hard he fell off his chair and took a long time to recover.  Jupitus and Brigstocke were reunited on the Radio 4 show (hosted by Brigstocke) I've Never Seen Star Wars, in which Jupitus tried out things that he'd never attempted before, such as eating a Findus Crispy Pancake, undergoing a colonic irrigation, and shaving another person's head.

During the 2008 Major League Baseball season, Jupitus presented a feature during the seventh inning stretch of Channel Five's featured Sunday night game. Each week he would read a section or quote from one of his favourite baseball-related books. He is a fan of the Boston Red Sox and has their logo tattooed on his arm.

In December 2008, Jupitus took part as a guest presenter on RTÉ's comical topical discussion show The Panel.

Theatre
Jupitus co-wrote and starred in the play Waiting for Alice with Andre Vincent which had a run at the Edinburgh Fringe Festival. The world premiere took place on 16 July 2007 at the St. Ives Theatre in St Ives, Cornwall.

Jupitus and Marcus Brigstocke appeared together in the UK tour of Totally Looped, performing at the Theatre Royal, Brighton, the Kings Theatre, Southsea and the Victoria Hall, Stoke-on-Trent in spring 2009.

In October 2009, Jupitus joined the West End theatre cast of Hairspray, playing the role of Edna Turnblad at the Shaftesbury Theatre. He joined the 2011 tour of Spamalot, playing the role of King Arthur.

On 16 January 2015, Jupitus was confirmed as starring opposite Jason Manford in the 2015 tour of Mel Brooks' musical The Producers, portraying Franz Liebkind. He has since appeared in Chitty Chitty Bang Bang also alongside Jason Manford on a tour of the UK.

Podcasts
From August 2008 he was the host of The Times football podcast "The Game", replacing the previous co-hosts Gabriele Marcotti and Guillem Balagué, although Marcotti was still a regular pundit on the show and hosted again on Jupitus' departure.

Between September 2008 and June 2011, Jupitus produced a podcast along with Phil Wilding, who produced his BBC 6Music show, called Phill and Phil's Perfect Ten. Initially being released fortnightly, it later became more sporadic due to the pair's work commitments. In April 2009, archive episodes were made available for purchase on Audible and iTunes as audiobook bundles of four with bonus 'perfect ones' attached. Since ending the podcast in June 2011 the pair have indicated that all back-episodes will be released free at some point in the future.

In 2018 Jupitus was interviewed by Jodie Cook for the Clever Tykes podcast: Creating Useful People. The podcast explores the childhood influences that shape future success. In Jupitus' episode he talked about how he developed his ethos for life and work, as well as his mum's dreams for him as a naval merchant.

Art 
Early in his career Jupitus drew cartoons which appeared in the NME, Time Out, Radio Times and The Guardian. In 2019 he started studying a degree in fine art at the Duncan of Jordanstone School of Art, Dundee University. He has also curated collections for the Art UK website. He wrote the foreword for the book Leigh Art in which he reminisces about childhood visits to Leigh-on-Sea and his enjoyment for the annual Leigh Art Trail.

Personal life

Jupitus is married with two children and  lives in Fife. His daughter Emily is an "Elf" (researcher and writer) for the game show QI.

He is an avid fan of West Ham United and the Boston Red Sox.

Jupitus discussed his arachnophobia with the writer and broadcaster Suzy Klein on the BBC Radio 4 programme I'm Suzy, and I'm a Phobic, which was broadcast in January 2013.

Filmography

Film

Television

References

External links

 
 
 
 Phill Jupitus' Biography on Chortle

1962 births
Living people
English male comedians
English radio personalities
English television presenters
Club DJs
People from Newport, Isle of Wight
People from Horndon-on-the-Hill
People from Stanford-le-Hope
BBC Radio 6 Music presenters
British radio DJs
The Panel (Irish TV series) presenters
Comedians from London